is a Japanese politician and member of the House of Representatives for the Japanese Communist Party.

1947 births
Living people
People from Iwate Prefecture
Ritsumeikan University alumni
Members of the House of Representatives (Japan)
Japanese Communist Party politicians
21st-century Japanese politicians